Wagerup Power Station is a 380MW dual natural gas and distillate fuelled power station located at Alcoa’s Wagerup refinery in south-west Western Australia.  Located about 130 km south of Perth, on the border of Western Australia’s Peel and South West regions, the Power Station is four kilometres north of Yarloop and 13 km south of Waroona. Wagerup is only operated when there is insufficient capacity in the South West Interconnected System to meet high demand.

Two open system gas turbines commenced operations at Wagerup in October 2007.

See also 

 Alinta Energy

References 

Natural gas-fired power stations in Western Australia
Oil-fired power stations in Western Australia
Peel (Western Australia)
South West (Western Australia)